The 2019 Davis Cup Qualifying Round was held on 1–2 February. The twelve winners of this round qualified for the 2019 Davis Cup Finals.

Teams
Twenty-four teams played for twelve spots in the Finals, in series decided on a home and away basis.

These twenty-four teams were:
 4 losing quarterfinalists of the previous edition,
 8 winners of World Group Play-offs of previous edition, and
 12 best teams not previously qualified with best ranking of their zone: 
 6 from Europe/Africa,
 3 from Asia/Oceania, and
 3 from Americas.

The 12 losing teams from the qualifying round will play at the Group I of the corresponding continental zone in September.

#: Ranking as of 29 October 2018.

Seeded teams

  (2018 Quarterfinalist, #4)  (2018 Play-off winner, #8)  (best ranked for replacing wild cards, #9)  (2018 Quarterfinalist, #10)  (2018 Quarterfinalist, #11)  (2nd best ranked for replacing wild cards, #12)  (2018 Quarterfinalist, #13)  (2018 Play-off winner, #14)  (2018 Play-off winner, #15)  (2018 Play-off winner, #16)  (2018 Play-off winner, #17)  (2018 Play-off winner, #18)Unseeded teams

  (Europe/Africa's best ranked, #21)  (Europe/Africa's 2nd best ranked, #22)  (Europe/Africa's 3rd best ranked, #23)  (Europe/Africa's 4th best ranked, #26)  (Europe/Africa's 5th best ranked, #27)  (Europe/Africa's 6th best ranked, #29)  (Asia/Oceania's best ranked, #20)  (Asia/Oceania's 2nd best ranked, #24)  (Asia/Oceania's 3rd best ranked, #30)  (Americas' best ranked, #19)  (Americas' 2nd best ranked, #25)  (Americas' 3rd best ranked, #28)''

Results summary

Qualifying round results

Brazil vs. Belgium

Uzbekistan vs. Serbia

Australia vs. Bosnia and Herzegovina

India vs. Italy

Germany vs. Hungary

Switzerland vs. Russia

Kazakhstan vs. Portugal

Czech Republic vs. Netherlands

Colombia vs. Sweden

Austria vs. Chile

Slovakia vs. Canada

China vs. Japan

References

External links
 Davis Cup Qualifiers draw

Qualifying Round
Davis Cup Qualifying Round
Davis Cup Qualifying Round
Davis Cup Qualifying Round
Davis Cup Qualifying Round